Victor Leroy Baltzell (June 20, 1912 – April 1986) was an American football fullback in the National Football League for the Washington Redskins.  He played college football for the Southwestern College Moundbuilders in Winfield, Kansas.

1912 births
1986 deaths
People from Soda Springs, Idaho
American football fullbacks
Washington Redskins players